A list of films produced by the Israeli film industry in 1960.

1960 releases

See also
1960 in Israel

References

External links
 Israeli films of 1960 at the Internet Movie Database

Israeli
Film
1960